Vodka Diaries is a 2018 Indian Hindi-language thriller film co-produced and directed by Kushal Srivastava. It is an unacknowledged remake of Shutter Island. Set in contemporary Manali, the story revolves around a club called Vodka Diaries, where a few murders occur and their investigation is undertaken by the protagonist, ACP Ashwini Dixit. The film was produced under the banner of K'Scope Entertainment Pvt.Ltd. and Vishalraj Films & Production Pvt. Ltd. and released on 19 January 2018.

Plot
A series of murders brings ACP Ashwini Dixit(Kay Kay Menon) and his junior colleague, Sub-Inspector Ankit Dayal(Sharib Hashmi) to the club Vodka Diaries in Manali. Three carefree and flirtatious young men are murdered on the same night in the presence of three mysterious women. Vodka Diaries seems to be the centre of the mystery. As the investigation deepens, his wife Shikha(Mandira Bedi), a poet, goes missing. Ashwini tries to unravel the reason behind her disappearance.

However, it is later shown that the victims are alive and well, and no one whom Ashwini had met is now able to recognise him. This puts the detective on a chase, with everyone he knows failing to recognise him or anything that he talks about, and a pursuit of his wife and the killer with anonymous calls and apparent clues appearing to him time and again. Towards the end, it is revealed that Ashwini's real name is Rishi Gautam, a famous writer. On the day of release of his new book, "Redemption of the Murderer", Gautam had quarreled with his wife Shikha, when he saw her with another man named Mayuk (Vikram Sakhalkar). In a fit of rage over her allegations of not spending quality time with her and wrongly suspecting her of infidelity, Gautam had accidentally killed Shikha by throwing a glass bottle at her. He was traumatised and was diagnosed with intensive obsessive identification disorder by psychiatrist Roshni (Raima Sen). Gautam began to hallucinate, believing he was the main protagonist detective of his book, Ashwini Dixit and thinking that Shikha is alive and with him. To treat him effectively, Roshni recreated the entire plot of his novel "Redemption of the Murderer", with the intention of getting Gautam to play the role of Ashwini in his book, with actors around him playing along with him and pretending to be characters of his book, but ultimately leading 'Ashwini' to discover the identity of Gautam Rishi for himself. Eventually Gautam is acquitted by court as Mayuk testifies that the former's act was accidental and not intentional.

In the end, Gautam alias Ashwini continues to live and work as a writer in a secluded cottage, with hallucinations of Shikha.

Cast
 Kay Kay Menon as ACP Ashwini Dixit/Rishi Gautam
 Raima Sen as Roshni Banerjee
 Mandira Bedi as Shikha Dixit
 Sharib Hashmi as Sr inspector Ankit Dayal
 Rishi Bhutani as Vivek Rajput
 Herry Tangri as Ronny
 Swati Rajput as Sera
 Vaishnavi Dhanraj As Ananya 
 Mohommed Ali Shah as Sam
 Sooraj Thapar as Hotel Manager
 Dipoo Srivastava as Hotel Receptionist
 Rahul Kapoor as Nikhil
 Antara Srivastava as Kavya
Vikram Sakhalkar as Mayuk

Soundtrack 

The soundtrack of Vodka Diaries has been composed by Parvaaz Band, Sandesh Shandilya and Harry Anand.

Reception

Critical response

Rajeev Masand criticized the film saying that, "The gorgeous snow laden landscape of Manali is the setting for Vodka Diaries, which starts out as a whodunit, quickly turns into a psychological thriller, before it finally reveals itself to be a waste of time." and gave the film a rating of 1.5 stars out of 5. Lasyapriya Sundaram of The Times of India appreciated the performances of the actors but criticized the poor writing saying that, "What works for the film are the performances by its lead actors. Kay Kay Menon, does the best he can with the material at hand. But even an accomplished performer like him cannot save a film that sounds conceptually good, but is derailed by its poor execution. The film's dialogue writing also leaves much to be desired. While the mystery should be intriguing in a suspense thriller, what remains a mystery is the lack of anything intriguing." and gave the film a rating of 2 stars out of 5. Shubhra Gupta of The Indian Express gave the film a rating of 1.5 stars out of 5 and said that, "On paper, Vodka Diaries, starring Kay Kay Menon, Raima Sen, Mandira Bedi, Sharib Hashmi, may have sounded like an engaging whodunit. But what we see is clearly not." Rohit Vats of Hindustan Times gave the film a rating of 2 stars out of 5 and said that, "Vodka Diaries is about under-utilised actors and losing a promising opening. It probably needed a more thorough approach."

Awards and nominations 

 It was selected as Official selection in 9th Jagaran Film festival. Mayank Shekhar was the festival director for the festival who selected the film.
It was selected as Official Selection in 11th Dada Saheb Phalke Film Festival, Noida in 2021.
 It was nominated at Next Big Thing Film Festival 2018 USA as Best Feature Film category.

References

External links
 
https://www.primevideo.com/detail/Vodka-Diaries/0OWMGWGHN33DG7UAGFFWQ53W5B
https://www.jiocinema.com/movies/vodka-diaries?type=0&id=27d04e101b3d11eb80f4f1dfa3b5e50d
https://www.netflix.com/title/81213874
https://www.shemaroome.com/movies/vodka-diaries
https://www.airtelxstream.in/movies/vodka-diaries/SHEMAROOME_MOVIE_5ba8d48ac1df413dae0002c9

2018 films
Indian thriller films
2010s Hindi-language films
Films set in Manali, Himachal Pradesh
Films set in Himachal Pradesh
2018 thriller films
Hindi-language thriller films